Rawi Hage (Arabic: راوي الحاج, romanized: Rāwī Ḥāj; born 1964) is a Lebanese-Canadian journalist, novelist, and photographer based in Canada.

Personal life
Hage is the common-law partner of novelist Madeleine Thien.

Writing
Hage has published journalism and fiction in Canadian and American magazines, and in the PEN America Journal. His debut novel, De Niro's Game (2006), won the 2008 International Dublin Literary Award, and was shortlisted for the 2006 Scotiabank Giller Prize and the 2006 Governor General's Award for English fiction. Commenting on their selection, the Dublin Literary Award judges remarked that "its originality, its power, its lyricism, as well as its humane appeal all mark De Niro's Game as the work of a major literary talent and make Rawi Hage a truly deserving winner." De Niro's Game was also awarded two Quebec awards, the Hugh MacLennan Prize for Fiction and the McAuslan First Book Prize. De Niro's Game was translated into Arabic by Ruhi Tu'mah in 2008 as مصائر الغبار

His second novel, Cockroach, was published in 2008 and was also shortlisted for the Giller Prize, the Governor General's Award and the Rogers Writers' Trust Fiction Prize. He was the winner of the Hugh MacLennan Prize for Fiction in 2008 and 2012 for his books Cockroach and Carnival, respectively.

In August 2013, he was named Vancouver Public Library's ninth writer in residence.

His 2018 novel Beirut Hellfire Society was named as a longlisted nominee for the Giller Prize, and a shortlisted finalist for both the Rogers Writers' Trust Fiction Prize and the Governor General's Award for English-language fiction.

In 2019 he won the Writers' Trust Engel/Findley Award from the Writers' Trust of Canada.

His 2022 novel Stray Dogs earned him his fourth Giller Prize nomination.

Awards and honours
In addition to the awards listed below, Sophie Voillot's translation of De Niro's Game was shortlisted for the 2008 Cole Foundation Prize for Translation.

Bibliography 
De Niro's Game (2006)
Cockroach (2008)
Carnival (2012)
Beirut Hellfire Society (2018)
Stray Dogs (2022)

References

External links
 
 

1964 births
Artists from Beirut
Artists from Montreal
Canadian male novelists
Lebanese emigrants to Canada
Living people
Writers from Beirut
Writers from Montreal
New York Institute of Photography alumni
Concordia University alumni
Dawson College alumni
21st-century Canadian novelists
21st-century Canadian male writers
21st-century Canadian photographers